Alexandra Trică (born 21 October 1985) is a Romanian female former volleyball player, playing as a right-side hitter. She was part of the Romania women's national volleyball team.

She competed at the 2011 Women's European Volleyball Championship. On club level, she played for Tomis Constanza.

References

External links
 

1985 births
Living people
Romanian women's volleyball players
Place of birth missing (living people)
Volleyball players at the 2015 European Games
European Games competitors for Romania